Hitchhiker 1 (or Hitchhiker P-11 4201) was a satellite launched by U.S. Air Force on June 27, 1963. It was launched with the aim of studying and measuring cosmic radiation. The satellite was the first successful satellite of the P-11 program, following the failure of the first Hitchhiker satellite in March 1963.

Instruments
 1 Geiger tube (40-4 MeV)
 1 Faraday cup plasma
 1 Electron detector (0.3-5.0 MeV)
 1 Proton detector (0.7-5.3 MeV)
 2 electrostatic analysers (4-100 keV)

See also 

 Corona program

References 

1963 in spaceflight
Derelict satellites orbiting Earth